The 1947 San Diego mayoral election was held on March 11, 1947 to elect the mayor for San Diego. Incumbent mayor Harley E. Knox stood for reelection to a second term. In the primary election, Knox received a majority of the votes and was elected outright with no need for a runoff.

Candidates
Harley E. Knox, Mayor of San Diego
Edgar F. Hastings
Joseph G. Shea

Campaign
Incumbent Mayor Harley E. Knox stood for reelection to a second term. On March 11, 1947 Knox received a majority of 67.9 percent of the vote in the primary election. This was more than 47 percent higher than what was received by Edgar F. Hastings, his nearest competitor. Because Knox was elected outright in the primary, no runoff election was held.

Primary Election results

General Election results
Because Knox received a majority of the votes in the primary, no general election was held.

References

1947
1940s in San Diego
1947 in California
1947 United States mayoral elections
March 1947 events in the United States